Rodau is a river of Lower Saxony, Germany. It is a left-hand tributary of the Wiedau.

The Rodau rises near , a borough of Visselhövede, in the district of Rotenburg an der Wümme at the foot of a  ridge of end moraine that falls away to the northwest and dates to the Drenthe stage of the Saale glaciation. The river then crosses the densely wooded and near-natural Rosebruch in the area of the Samtgemeinde Bothel and discharges into the Wiedau at Rotenburg an der Wümme, before the Wiedau in turn enters the Wümme after only .

The Vissel joins the Rodau near Bothel. This stream rises in Visselhövede in one of the biggest springs in the Lower Saxon Plain and, at its mouth, carries around 25% more water than the Rodau, hence it is actually the main headstream of the Rodau.

Water sport 
The Rodau is a popular area with anglers and canoeists.

See also
List of rivers of Lower Saxony

References

Rivers of Lower Saxony
Lüneburg Heath
Rotenburg (district)
Rivers of Germany